Gradski Stadion Velika Gorica , also known as Gradski stadion Velika Gorica  or Stadion ŠRC Velika Gorica, is an association football stadium in Velika Gorica, Croatia. It is the home stadium for the HNK Gorica football club. The stadium has a capacity of 4,536, all of which is seated.

The stadium was built for the 1987 Summer Universiade, held in the nearby Croatian capital Zagreb. It has since been renovated three times, in 1999 for the Military World Games held in Zagreb, in 2010 to meet the requirements for Druga HNL Croatian second-level league and finally in 2019 when the stadium became an all-seater.

References

Radnik
Speedway venues in Croatia
Rugby union stadiums in Croatia
Velika Gorica
Radnik
HNK Gorica